Üzeyir Garih (1929 – August 25, 2001) was a Turkish engineer, businessman, writer and investor.

Early years
Üzeyir Garih was born in İstanbul on 28 June 1929. He graduated from Istanbul Technical University ranking in the Dean's Honors list. He received his Master of Science degree in Mechanical Engineering in 1951. Later in 1984, Istanbul Technical University granted him with an Honorary Ph.D. Doctorate degree. Garih successfully served in the Turkish Air Force as a reserve officer.

Career
Being one of the best engineers of the country, he started his career at the İstanbul agency of Carrier Corporation in the field of heating, ventilation and air conditioning. In 1954, he joined İshak Alaton in founding what became Alarko Holding, for which he served as president and co-chairman until 2001. Today, Alarko is an enterprise, which is active in six major business sectors, namely contracting, energy, industry and trade, tourism, land development and sea food products. Alarko Group employs more than 6,000 people in one of Turkey's largest construction companies, as well as organizations, which carry out projects involving natural gas installations, hydro-electric and thermal power plants, hotel management and salmon farming, not only in Turkey, but also in the Middle East, Russia, and CIS countries.

Garih, as an international business leader, philosopher, and nationwide teacher, has written more than 200 articles in various newspapers and magazines. He has written eight books entitled "My Experiences", which were bestsellers in Turkey for several years. He has written 18 books in total. He was a columnist in the newspapers Akşam and in the Turkish Daily News as well as panelist in TV programs. He was one of the highest ranked lecturers and opinion leaders among the major Turkish university circles. He gave more than 300 lectures at various universities. He was a teacher for MBA students in Yeditepe University of İstanbul. He was the co-founder of Alarko Educational Foundation, which provided scholarships for thousands of Turkish students. He was also a board member of AIESEC.

Üzeyir Garih was the founder of the Young Presidents Organization's (YPO) İstanbul Chapter. He was the president of Turkish Developers' Association, the president of Turkish-Belgian Business Council, and council member of the Chamber of Industry. He was a member of World Presidents Organization (WPO) and senior member of Rotary Club  Istanbul. He was also appointed as the Honorary Consul General of the Republic of the Philippines in İstanbul. He was fluent in speaking and writing Turkish, English, French, and Spanish.

Death
Üzeyir Garih was stabbed to death next to Muslim Eyüp Cemetery during a visit on 25 August 2001. After a religious funeral ceremony at the Neve Shalom Synagogue, he was laid to rest at the Ulus Sephardi Jewish Cemetery.

The murderer was captured ten days later, tried and sentenced to life imprisonment. The reasons behind this killing are still debated to this day.

References

External links
 Üzeyir Garih in memoriam page in English at Alarko website
 Bibliography of Dr. Üzeyir Garih
 Last photographs of Üzeyir Garih at Alarko website

1929 births
2001 deaths
20th-century Turkish businesspeople
20th-century Sephardi Jews
21st-century Sephardi Jews
Businesspeople from Istanbul
Deaths by stabbing in Turkey
Istanbul Technical University alumni
Jewish engineers
Jewish writers
People murdered in Turkey
Turkish Air Force personnel
Turkish chief executives
Turkish Jews
Turkish mechanical engineers
Turkish non-fiction writers